The Grand Canal (Italian: Canal Grande [kaˌnal ˈɡrande]; Venetian: Canal Grando, anciently Canałasso [kanaˈɰaso]) is the central water course in the city of Venice, Italy.

The following table lists the architectural and navigational landmarks on the two sides of the canal, listed from west to east. Water features have a blue background. Bridges have a light grey background.

References

External links

Canals in Venice
Geography of Venice
Water transport in Venice
Tourist attractions in Venice
Waterways of Italy